"Bro, Ikaw ang Star ng Pasko", often known simply as "Star ng Pasko", is a Filipino-language Christmas song produced by the media company ABS-CBN. The song was released on November 4, 2009.

Concept
Written by lyricist Robert G. Labayen and composers Marcus and Amber Davis, it serves as a Christmas message of hope, unity, and thankfulness to God for Filipinos in the wake of the disasters caused by Typhoons Ondoy and Pepeng. The use of the nickname "Bro" to refer to God comes from the dialogue of the lead character Santino, portrayed by Zaijian Jaranilla in the television series May Bukas Pa, which was the most popular program in the Philippines in 2009.

The original concept for the station ID was “Dumadaloy Ang Liwanag”, according to production manager Danie Sedilla, but was revised after Ondoy and Pepeng's onslaught. Robert Labayen rewrote the song to be more inspirational in light of the aforementioned tragedies, recalling how he was "crying while writing [Star ng Pasko] on the roof deck". Star ng Pasko was also the first ABS-CBN Christmas station ID to use a Contemporary R&B beat.

"Star ng Pasko" was unveiled as part of the station ID on November 4, 2009, and became an immediate success among Filipinos. Approximately 200 personalities who are under ABS-CBN were involved in the production of "Bro, Ikaw ang Star ng Pasko," including KC Concepcion, Piolo Pascual, Billy Crawford, Aiza Seguerra, Nina, Mark Bautista, Rachelle Ann Go and Sarah Geronimo among others. Shooting for the station ID lasted for seven days, and some scenes, including the opening, were shot in Brgy. Banaba, San Mateo, which was one of the areas affected by Typhoon Ondoy.

This station ID also marked Dolphy's last ABS-CBN station ID appearance, and the first time John Lloyd Cruz and Angel Locsin appeared together in one frame (during the bridge part).

The song has musical similarities with Star ng Pasko's predecessors 2002's Isang Pamilya, Isang Puso, Ngayong Pasko, 2004's Sabay Tayo, Kapamilya, and 2007's Walang Mag-iisa Ngayong Pasko which were released seven, five, and two years before the release of Star ng Pasko, respectively.

Legacy
In the years since the song's release, it is often considered the most popular Christmas station ID song of ABS-CBN. In 2010, the station ID won a Silver Award for Best Media Initiated Campaign at the 4th Tambuli Awards. Labayen himself considers the song to be his career's best work. It was also nominated for Best Christmas Recording at the 2010 Awit Awards.

As a result of Star ng Pasko's success, the musical tune that was used on 2002's Isang Pamilya, Isang Puso, Ngayong Pasko, 2004's Sabay Tayo, Kapamilya, 2007's Walang Mag-iisa Ngayong Pasko, and 2009's Star ng Pasko itself continued to be used on the network's succeeding Christmas Station IDs, which are the 2010's Ngayong Pasko Magniningning Ang Pilipino (where Star ng Pasko was sampled), 2017's Just Love Ngayong Christmas after the first bridge, and 2020's Ikaw ang Liwanag at Ligaya (which also has the same message of faith in God), released on November 4, 2010, November 2, 2017, and November 27, 2020 (which were released one, seven, and eleven years after the release of Star ng Pasko), respectively. Star ng Pasko was also sampled on 2019's Family is Forever which was released on November 18, 2019 (along with 2015's Thank You for the Love, 2017's Just Love Ngayong Christmas and 2018's Family is Love). The difference between the end of Star ng Pasko itself and its four succeeding station IDs (2010, 2017, 2019, and 2020) is that the former has both the ABS-CBN and its slogan "In the Service of the Filipino" jingle, while the said four Christmas station IDs simply use the network's jingle at the end.

Cover version
In 2020, an acoustic rendition of the song was performed by Vivoree Esclito and Patrick Quiroz.

Commercial use
The song was used in one episode of the 2021 iQiyi original series Saying Goodbye.

References

2009 songs
ABS-CBN
All-star recordings
Christmas songs
Tagalog-language songs